Marcus Gavius Squilla Gallicanus was a Roman senator active during the first half of the second century AD. He was ordinary consul for 127 as the colleague of Titus Atilius Rufus Titianus. Gallicanus is known only from inscriptions.

The origins of the family of Gallicanus lie in Verona; an inscription mentioning one M. Gavius M.f. Pob. Squillianus has been recovered from there.

Family
Gallicanus was married to a woman named Pompeia Agrippinilla. Two men are known to be his sons: Marcus Gavius Squilla Gallicanus, ordinary consul in 150, and Marcus Gavius Orfitus, ordinary consul in 165.

See also
 List of Roman consuls

References

Imperial Roman consuls
2nd-century Romans
Squilla Gallicanus